The figure skating team event was a combined competition of Olympic figure skating disciplines at the 2014 Winter Olympics, held at the Iceberg Skating Palace in Sochi, Russia.

The competition took place over three days between 6 and 9 February, with the short programs taking place on 6 and 8 February, and the free skating and free dances taking place on 8 and 9 February.

This was the first time the team event for figure skating was held during the Olympic Games.

The medals for the competition were presented by Alexander Zhukov, Russian Federation; Dick Pound, Canada; and Ottavio Cinquanta, Italy; IOC Members, and the medalists' bouquets were presented by David Dore, Canada; Marie Lundmark, Finland; Junko Hiramatsu, Japan; International Skating Union.

Timeline
The team event competition took place on 6, 8, and 9 February. The official schedule was as follows:

All times are (UTC+4).

Records
For complete list of figure skating records, see list of highest scores in figure skating.

The following new best score was set during this competition:

Evgeni Plushenko (RUS) tied the record of four Olympic figure skating medals (in the early years of the sport, Gillis Grafström won four medals between 1920 and 1932).

Yulia Lipnitskaya (RUS) became the second-youngest Olympic gold medalist in figure skating, behind Maxi Herber who won pair skating at the 1936 Winter Olympics. Under modern age eligibility rules, Herber would have been 99 days too young to skate at the Olympics.

Entries
Member nations submitted the following entries:

Results

Short programs

Men

Pairs

Ice dance

Ladies

Free programs

Pairs

Men

Ladies

Ice dance

Team overall
The final results were as follows:

Judges and officials
 Referee: Mona Jonsson, Fabio Bianchetti
 Technical Controller: Paolo Pizzocari, Karen Archer
 Technical Specialist: Anett Pötzsch, Troy Goldstein
 Assistant Technical Specialist: Olga Markova, Peter Cain
 Judges (SP): Yukiko Okabe, Sissy Krick, Elizabeth Littler, Karen Butcher, Evgeni Rokhin, Samuel Auxier, Igor Obraztsov, Peter Levin, Tatiana Yordanova
 Judges (FS): Tatiana Yordanova, Nikolai Salnikov, Sissy Krick, Karen Butcher, Elizabeth Littler, Yumin Wang, Vladslav Perukhov, Elena Fomina, Albert Zaydman

References

External links
 Sochi 2014 Figure Skating – Team page 
 Sochi 2014 Figure Skating Results Book
 2014 Winter Olympics page at the International Skating Union
 

Team Trophy
Mixed events at the 2014 Winter Olympics
2014 in figure skating